Jet wash, jet-wash, or jetwash may refer to:
 Wake turbulence, turbulence that forms behind an aircraft as it passes through the air
 Pressure washing, the use of high-pressure water spray to clean various objects, usually outdoors
 A self-serve car wash (primarily in Europe)